This list of birds of Corsica includes the 367 bird species that have been recorded on the island.

Corsica is a French island in the Mediterranean Sea located west of the Italian Peninsula, southeast of the French mainland, and north of the Italian island of Sardinia. Mountains make up two-thirds of the island, forming a single chain.

The status of each species is based on the annotated list by Jean-Claude Thibault and Gilles Bonaccorsi published in 1999 with supplemental additions from Avibase. This list's taxonomic treatment (designation and sequence of orders, families and species) and nomenclature (common and scientific names) follow the conventions of The Clements Checklist of Birds of the World, 2022 edition. The family accounts at the beginning of each heading reflect this taxonomy, as do the species counts found in each family account. Accidental species are included in the total species count for Corsica.

Ducks, geese, and waterfowl
Order: AnseriformesFamily: Anatidae

Anatidae includes the ducks and most duck-like waterfowl, such as geese and swans. These birds are adapted to an aquatic existence with webbed feet, flattened bills, and feathers that are excellent at shedding water due to an oily coating.

 Graylag goose - Anser anser - (Oie cendrée) Passage migrant and winter visitor
 Greater white-fronted goose - Anser albifrons
 Mute swan - Cygnus olor - (Cygne tuberculé) Accidental visitor
 Black swan - Cygnus atratus -  Introduced species
 Tundra swan - Cygnus columbianus (Cygne siffleur) Accidental visitor
 Ruddy shelduck - Tadorna ferruginea - (Tadorne casarca) Accidental visitor
 Common shelduck - Tadorna tadorna - (Tadorne de Belon) Passage migrant and winter visitor
 Garganey - Spatula querquedula - (Sarcelle d'été) Passage migrant and occasional breeder
 Blue-winged teal - Spatula discors - (Sarcelle à ailes bleues) Accidental visitor
 Northern shoveler - Spatula clypeata - (Canard souchet) Passage migrant, winter visitor and occasional breeder
 Gadwall - Mareca strepera - (Canard chipeau) Passage migrant and winter visitor
 Eurasian wigeon - Mareca penelope - (Canard siffleur) Passage migrant and winter visitor
 Mallard - Anas platyrhynchos - (Canard colvert) Resident breeder
 Northern pintail - Anas acuta - (Canard pilet) Passage migrant and winter visitor
 Green-winged teal - Anas crecca - (Sarcelle d'hiver) Passage migrant and winter visitor
 Marbled teal - Marmaronetta angustirostris - (Sarcelle marbrée) Accidental visitor
 Red-crested pochard - Netta rufina - (Nette rousse) Resident breeder and passage migrant
 Common pochard - Aythya ferina - (Fuligule milouin) Winter visitor and passage migrant
 Ferruginous duck - Aythya nyroca - (Fuligule nyroca) Passage migrant and occasional breeder
 Tufted duck - Aythya fuligula - (Fuligule morillon) Winter visitor and passage migrant
 Greater scaup - Aythya marila - (Fuligule milouinan) Accidental visitor
 Common eider - Somateria mollissima - (Eider à duvet) Accidental visitor
 Velvet scoter - Melanitta fusca - (Macreuse brune) Accidental visitor
 Common scoter - Melanitta nigra -  Accidental visitor
 Long-tailed duck - Clangula hyemalis - (Harelde kakawi) Accidental visitor
 Common goldeneye - Bucephala clangula - (Garrot à oeil d'or) Accidental visitor
 Smew - Mergellus albellus - (Harle piette) Accidental visitor
 Common merganser - Mergus merganser - (Harle bièvre) Accidental visitor
 Red-breasted merganser - Mergus serrator - (Harle huppé) Winter visitor and passage migrant
 Ruddy duck - Oxyura jamaicensis - (Érismature rousse) Introduced species
 White-headed duck - Oxyura leucocephala - (Érismature à tête blanche) Former breeder, extirpated

Pheasants, grouse, and allies
Order: GalliformesFamily: Phasianidae

These are terrestrial species of gamebirds, feeding and nesting on the ground. They are variable in size but generally plump, with broad and relatively short wings. 

 Ring-necked pheasant - Phasianus colchicus - (Faisan de Colchide) Introduced breeder
 Common quail - Coturnix coturnix - (Caille des blés) Breeding visitor and passage migrant
 Red-legged partridge - Alectoris rufa - (Perdrix rouge) Introduced breeder

Flamingos
Order: PhoenicopteriformesFamily: Phoenicopteridae

Flamingos filter-feed on shellfish and algae. Their oddly shaped beaks are specially adapted to separate mud and silt from the food they consume and, uniquely, are used upside-down. 

 Greater flamingo - Phoenicopterus roseus - (Flamant rose) Passage migrant and winter visitor

Grebes
Order: PodicipediformesFamily: Podicipedidae

Grebes are small to medium-large freshwater diving birds. They have lobed toes and are excellent swimmers and divers. However, they have their feet placed far back on the body, making them quite ungainly on land. 

 Little grebe - Tachybaptus ruficollis - (Grèbe castagneux) Resident breeder and winter visitor
 Horned grebe - Podiceps auritus - (Grèbe esclavon) Accidental visitor
 Red-necked grebe - Podiceps grisegena - (Grèbe jougris) Passage migrant and winter visitor
 Great crested grebe - Podiceps cristatus - (Grèbe huppé) Resident breeder, passage migrant and winter visitor
 Eared grebe - Podiceps nigricollis - (Grèbe à cou noir) Passage migrant, winter visitor and occasional breeder

Pigeons and doves
Order: ColumbiformesFamily: Columbidae

Pigeons and doves are stout-bodied birds with short necks and short slender bills with a fleshy cere.

 Rock pigeon - Columba livia - (Pigeon biset) Resident breeder
 Stock dove - Columba oenas - (Pigeon colombin) Passage migrant and winter visitor
 Common wood-pigeon - Columba palumbus - (Pigeon ramier) Passage migrant, winter visitor and resident breeder
 European turtle-dove - Streptopelia turtur - (Tourterelle des bois) Passage migrant and breeding visitor
 Eurasian collared-dove - Streptopelia decaocto - (Tourterelle turque) Resident breeder

Bustards
Order: OtidiformesFamily: Otididae

Bustards are large terrestrial birds mainly associated with dry open country and steppes in the Old World. They are omnivorous and nest on the ground. They walk steadily on strong legs and big toes, pecking for food as they go. They have long broad wings with "fingered" wingtips and striking patterns in flight. Many have interesting mating displays. 

 Little bustard - Tetrax tetrax - (Outarde canepetière) Accidental visitor

Cuckoos
Order: CuculiformesFamily: Cuculidae

The family Cuculidae includes cuckoos, roadrunners and anis. These birds are of variable size with slender bodies, long tails and strong legs. The Old World cuckoos are brood parasites.

 Great spotted cuckoo - Clamator glandarius - (Coucou geai) Accidental visitor
 Common cuckoo - Cuculus canorus - (Coucou gris) Passage migrant and breeding visitor

Nightjars and allies
Order: CaprimulgiformesFamily: Caprimulgidae

Nightjars are medium-sized nocturnal birds that usually nest on the ground. They have long wings, short legs and very short bills. Most have small feet, of little use for walking, and long pointed wings. Their soft plumage is camouflaged to resemble bark or leaves. 

 Eurasian nightjar - Caprimulgus europaeus - (Engoulevent d'Europe) Passage migrant

Swifts
Order: CaprimulgiformesFamily: Apodidae

Swifts are small birds which spend the majority of their lives flying. These birds have very short legs and never settle voluntarily on the ground, perching instead only on vertical surfaces. Many swifts have long swept-back wings which resemble a crescent or boomerang.

 Alpine swift - Apus melba - (Martinet à ventre blanc) Breeding visitor and passage migrant
 Common swift - Apus apus - (Martinet noir) Breeding visitor and passage migrant
 Pallid swift - Apus pallidus - (Martinet pâle) Breeding visitor and passage migrant
 Little swift - Apus affinis - Accidental visitor

Rails, gallinules, and coots
Order: GruiformesFamily: Rallidae

Rallidae is a large family of small to medium-sized birds which includes the rails, crakes, coots and gallinules. Typically they inhabit dense vegetation in damp environments near lakes, swamps or rivers. In general they are shy and secretive birds, making them difficult to observe. Most species have strong legs and long toes which are well adapted to soft uneven surfaces. They tend to have short, rounded wings and to be weak fliers.

 Water rail - Rallus aquaticus - (Râle d'eau) Resident breeder, passage migrant and winter visitor
 Corn crake - Crex crex - (Râle des genêts) Accidental visitor
 Spotted crake - Porzana porzana - (Marouette ponctuée) Passage migrant
 Eurasian moorhen - Gallinula chloropus - (Poule d'eau) Resident breeder, passage migrant and winter visitor
 Eurasian coot - Fulica atra - (Foulque macroule) Winter visitor, resident breeder and passage migrant
 Western swamphen - Porphyrio porphyrio - (Talève sultane) Accidental visitor
 Little crake - Zapornia parva - (Marouette poussin) Passage migrant
 Baillon's crake - Zapornia pusilla - (Marouette de Baillon) Accidental visitor

Cranes
Order: GruiformesFamily: Gruidae

Cranes are large, long-legged and long-necked birds. Unlike the similar-looking but unrelated herons, cranes fly with necks outstretched, not pulled back. Most have elaborate and noisy courting displays or "dances". 

 Common crane - Grus grus - (Grue cendrée) Passage migrant and winter visitor

Thick-knees
Order: CharadriiformesFamily: Burhinidae

The thick-knees are a group of largely tropical waders in the family Burhinidae. They are found worldwide within the tropical zone, with some species also breeding in temperate Europe and Australia. They are medium to large waders with strong black or yellow-black bills, large yellow eyes and cryptic plumage. Despite being classed as waders, most species have a preference for arid or semi-arid habitats.

 Eurasian thick-knee - Burhinus oedicnemus - (Œdicnème criard) Passage migrant and winter visitor

Stilts and avocets
Order: CharadriiformesFamily: Recurvirostridae

Recurvirostridae is a family of large wading birds, which includes the avocets and stilts. The avocets have long legs and long up-curved bills. The stilts have extremely long legs and long, thin, straight bills.

 Black-winged stilt - Himantopus himantopus - (Échasse blanche) Passage migrant and occasional breeder
 Pied avocet - Recurvirostra avosetta - (Avocette élégante) Passage migrant and winter visitor

Oystercatchers
Order: CharadriiformesFamily: Haematopodidae

The oystercatchers are large and noisy plover-like birds, with strong bills used for smashing or prising open molluscs.

 Eurasian oystercatcher - Haematopus ostralegus - (Huîtrier pie) Passage migrant

Plovers and lapwings
Order: CharadriiformesFamily: Charadriidae

The family Charadriidae includes the plovers, dotterels and lapwings. They are small to medium-sized birds with compact bodies, short, thick necks and long, usually pointed, wings. They are found in open country worldwide, mostly in habitats near water. 

 Black-bellied plover - Pluvialis squatarola - (Pluvier argenté) Passage migrant
 European golden-plover - Pluvialis apricaria - (Pluvier doré) Passage migrant and winter visitor
 Northern lapwing - Vanellus vanellus - (Vanneau huppé) Passage migrant and winter visitor
 Kentish plover - Charadrius alexandrinus - (Pluvier à collier interrompu) Passage migrant, winter visitor and occasional breeder
 Common ringed plover - Charadrius hiaticula - (Pluvier grand-gravelot) Passage migrant
 Little ringed plover - Charadrius dubius - (Pluvier petit-gravelot) Breeding visitor and passage migrant
 Eurasian dotterel - Charadrius morinellus - (Pluvier guignard) Accidental visitor

Sandpipers and allies
Order: CharadriiformesFamily: Scolopacidae

Scolopacidae is a large diverse family of small to medium-sized shorebirds including the sandpipers, curlews, godwits, shanks, tattlers, woodcocks, snipes, dowitchers and phalaropes. The majority of these species eat small invertebrates picked out of the mud or soil. Variation in length of legs and bills enables multiple species to feed in the same habitat, particularly on the coast, without direct competition for food. 

 Whimbrel - Numenius phaeopus - (Courlis corlieu) Passage migrant
 Eurasian curlew - Numenius arquata - (Courlis cendré) Passage migrant and winter visitor
 Bar-tailed godwit - Limosa lapponica - (Barge rousse) Passage migrant
 Black-tailed godwit - Limosa limosa - (Barge à queue noire) Passage migrant
 Ruddy turnstone - Arenaria interpres - (Tournepierre à collier) Passage migrant
 Red knot - Calidris canutus - (Bécasseau maubèche) Passage migrant
 Ruff - Calidris pugnax - (Combattant varié) Passage migrant
 Broad-billed sandpiper - Calidris falcinellus - (Bécasseau falcinelle) Accidental visitor
 Curlew sandpiper - Calidris ferruginea - (Bécasseau cocorli) Passage migrant
 Temminck's stint - Calidris temminckii - (Bécasseau de Temminck) Passage migrant
 Sanderling - Calidris alba - (Bécasseau sanderling) Passage migrant
 Dunlin - Calidris alpina - (Bécasseau variable) Passage migrant
 Little stint - Calidris minuta - (Bécasseau minute) Passage migrant
 Least sandpiper - Calidris minutilla -  Accidental visitor
 Jack snipe - Lymnocryptes minimus - (Bécassine sourde) Passage migrant and winter visitor
 Eurasian woodcock - Scolopax rusticola - (Bécasse des bois) Passage migrant, winter visitor and occasional breeder
 Great snipe - Gallinago media - (Bécassine double) Passage migrant
 Common snipe - Gallinago gallinago - (Bécassine des marais) Passage migrant and winter visitor
 Terek sandpiper - Xenus cinereus - (Chevalier bargette) Accidental visitor
 Wilson's phalarope - Phalaropus tricolor - Accidental visitor
 Common sandpiper - Actitis hypoleucos - (Chevalier guignette) Passage migrant, winter visitor and occasional breeder
 Green sandpiper - Tringa ochropus - (Chevalier cul-blanc) Passage migrant
 Spotted redshank - Tringa erythropus - (Chevalier arlequin) Passage migrant
 Common greenshank - Tringa nebularia - (Chevalier aboyeur) Passage migrant
 Marsh sandpiper - Tringa stagnatilis - (Chevalier stagnatile) Passage migrant
 Wood sandpiper - Tringa glareola - (Chevalier sylvain) Passage migrant
 Common redshank - Tringa totanus - (Chevalier gambette) Passage migrant

Pratincoles and coursers
Order: CharadriiformesFamily: Glareolidae

Glareolidae is a family of wading birds comprising the pratincoles, which have short legs, long pointed wings and long forked tails, and the coursers, which have long legs, short wings and long, pointed bills which curve downwards.

 Cream-colored courser - Cursorius cursor -  Accidental visitor
 Collared pratincole - Glareola pratincola - (Glaréole à collier) Passage migrant

Skuas and jaegers
Order: CharadriiformesFamily: Stercorariidae

The family Stercorariidae are, in general, medium to large sea birds, typically with grey or brown plumage, often with white markings on the wings. They nest on the ground in temperate and arctic regions and are long-distance migrants. 

 Great skua - Stercorarius skua - (Grand Labbe) Passage migrant
 Pomarine jaeger - Stercorarius pomarinus - (Labbe pomarin) Accidental visitor
 Parasitic jaeger - Stercorarius parasiticus - (Labbe parasite) Accidental visitor
 Long-tailed jaeger - Stercorarius longicaudus - (Labbe à longue queue) Accidental visitor

Auks, murres, and puffins
Order: CharadriiformesFamily: Alcidae

A family of seabirds which are superficially similar to penguins with their black-and-white colours, their upright posture and some of their habits but which are able to fly. 

 Dovekie - Alle alle - (Mergule nain) Accidental visitor
 Razorbill - Alca torda - (Petit pingouin) Passage migrant
 Atlantic puffin - Fratercula arctica - (Macareux moine) Passage migrant and winter visitor

Gulls, terns, and skimmers
Order: CharadriiformesFamily: Laridae

Laridae is a family of medium to large seabirds and includes gulls, terns, and skimmers. Gulls are typically grey or white, often with black markings on the head or wings. They have stout, longish bills and webbed feet. Terns are a group of generally medium to large seabirds typically with grey or white plumage, often with black markings on the head. Most terns hunt fish by diving but some pick insects off the surface of fresh water. Terns are generally long-lived birds, with several species known to live in excess of 30 years.

 Black-legged kittiwake - Rissa tridactyla - (Mouette tridactyle) Passage migrant and winter visitor
 Sabine's gull - Xema sabini - (Mouette de Sabine) Accidental visitor
 Slender-billed gull - Chroicocephalus genei - (Goéland railleur) Passage migrant
 Black-headed gull - Chroicocephalus ridibundus - (Mouette rieuse) Winter visitor and passage migrant
 Little gull - Hydrocoloeus minutus - (Mouette pygmée) Passage migrant and winter visitor
 Mediterranean gull - Ichthyaetus melanocephalus - (Mouette mélanocéphale) Passage migrant and winter visitor
 Pallas's gull - Ichthyaetus ichthyaetus - (Goéland ichthyaète) Accidental visitor
 Audouin's gull - Ichthyaetus audouinii - (Goéland d'Audouin) Resident breeder and passage migrant
 Common gull - Larus canus - (Goéland cendré) Passage migrant and winter visitor
 Herring gull - Larus argentatus 
 Yellow-legged gull - Larus michahellis - (Goéland leucophée) Resident breeder
 Caspian gull - Larus cachinnans 
 Lesser black-backed gull - Larus fuscus - (Goéland brun) Passage migrant and winter visitor
 Little tern - Sternula albifrons - (Sterne naine) Passage migrant
 Gull-billed tern - Gelochelidon nilotica - (Sterne hansel) Passage migrant
 Caspian tern - Hydroprogne caspia - (Sterne caspienne) Passage migrant and former breeder
 Black tern - Chlidonias niger - (Guifette noire) Passage migrant
 White-winged tern - Chlidonias leucopterus - (Guifette leucoptère) Passage migrant
 Whiskered tern - Chlidonias hybrida - (Guifette moustac) Passage migrant
 Common tern - Sterna hirundo - (Sterne pierregarin) Passage migrant and occasional breeder
 Arctic tern - Sterna paradisaea 
 Sandwich tern - Thalasseus sandvicensis - (Sterne caugek) Passage migrant and winter visitor
 Lesser crested tern - Thalasseus bengalensis - (Sterne voyageuse) Accidental visitor

Loons
Order: GaviiformesFamily: Gaviidae

Loons are a group of aquatic birds found in many parts of North America (where they are known as loons) and Northern Europe. They are the size of a large duck or small goose, which they somewhat resemble in shape when swimming, but to which they are completely unrelated. In particular, divers' legs are set very far back which assists swimming underwater but makes walking on land extremely difficult. 

 Red-throated loon - Gavia stellata - (Plongeon catmarin) Accidental visitor
 Arctic loon - Gavia arctica - (Plongeon artique) Winter visitor

Albatrosses
Order: ProcellariiformesFamily: Diomedeidae

The albatrosses are among the largest flying birds, with long, narrow wings for gliding. The majority are found in the Southern Hemisphere with only vagrants occurring in the North Atlantic.

 Black-browed albatross - Thalassarche melanophris -  Accidental visitor

Northern storm-petrels
Order: ProcellariiformesFamily: Hydrobatidae

The family Hydrobatidae is the northern storm-petrels, small pelagic petrels with a fluttering flight which often follow ships.

 European storm-petrel - Hydrobates pelagicus - (Océanite tempête) Breeding visitor

Shearwaters and petrels
Order: ProcellariiformesFamily: Procellariidae

The procellariids are the main group of medium-sized "true petrels", characterised by united nostrils with medium septum and a long outer functional primary. 

 Bulwer's petrel - Bulweria bulwerii - Accidental visitor
 Cory's shearwater - Calonectis diomedea - (Puffin cendré) Breeding visitor and passage migrant
 Manx shearwater - Puffinus puffinus
 Yelkouan shearwater - Puffinus yelkouan - (Puffin yelkouan) Winter visitor, passage migrant and occasional breeder
 Balearic shearwater - Puffinus mauretanicus
 Barolo shearwater - Puffinus baroli - Accidental visitor

Storks
Order: CiconiiformesFamily: Ciconiidae

Storks are large, long-legged, long-necked, wading birds with long, stout bills. Storks are mute, but bill-clattering is an important mode of communication at the nest. Their nests can be large and may be reused for many years. Many species are migratory. 

 Black stork - Ciconia nigra - (Cigogne noire) Passage migrant
 White stork - Ciconia ciconia - (Cigogne blanche) Passage migrant and winter visitor

Boobies and gannets
Order: SuliformesFamily: Sulidae

The sulids comprise the gannets and boobies. Both groups are medium to large coastal seabirds that plunge-dive for fish. 

 Northern gannet - Morus bassanus - (Fou de Bassan) Winter visitor and passage migrant

Cormorants and shags
Order: SuliformesFamily: Phalacrocoracidae

Phalacrocoracidae is a family of medium-to-large fish-eating seabirds that includes cormorants and shags. Plumage colouration varies, with the majority having mainly dark plumage. 

 Pygmy cormorant - Microcarbo pygmaeus - Accidental visitor
 Great cormorant - Phalacrocorax carbo - (Grand Cormoran) Winter visitor and passage migrant
 European shag - Gulosus aristotelis - (Cormoran huppé) Resident breeder

Pelicans
Order: PelecaniformesFamily: Pelecanidae

The Pelecanidae are a family of large water birds. They have a long beak and a large throat pouch used for catching prey. 

 Great white pelican - Pelecanus onocrotalus - (Pélican blanc) Accidental visitor

Herons, egrets, and bitterns
Order: PelecaniformesFamily: Ardeidae

The family Ardeidae contains bitterns, herons and egrets. Herons and egrets are medium to large wading birds with long necks and legs. Bitterns tend to be shorter necked and more wary. Members of Ardeidae fly with their necks retracted, unlike other long-necked birds such as storks, ibises and spoonbills. 

 Great bittern - Botaurus stellata - (Butor étoilé) Passage migrant and winter visitor
 Little bittern - Ixobrychus minutus - (Blongios nain) Breeding visitor and passage migrant
 Gray heron - Ardea cinerea - (Héron cendré) Winter visitor
 Purple heron - Ardea purpurea - (Héron pourpré) Breeding visitor
 Great egret - Ardea alba - (Grande aigrette) Winter visitor
 Little egret - Egretta garzetta - (Aigrette garzette) Passage migrant, winter visitor and occasional breeder
 Western reef-heron - Egretta gularis - (Aigrette à gorge blanche) Accidental visitor
 Cattle egret - Bubulcus ibis - (Héron garde-boeufs) Winter visitor, passage migrant and occasional breeder
 Squacco heron - Ardeola ralloides - (Héron crabier) Passage migrant
 Black-crowned night-heron - Nycticorax nycticorax - (Bihoreau gris) Passage migrant

Ibises and spoonbills
Order: PelecaniformesFamily: Threskiornithidae

Threskiornithidae is a family of large terrestrial and wading birds which includes the ibises and spoonbills. They have long, broad wings with 11 primary and about 20 secondary feathers. They are strong fliers and, despite their size and weight, very capable soarers. 

 Glossy ibis - Plegadis falcinellus - (Ibis falcinelle) Passage migrant
 Northern bald ibis - Geronticus eremita -  Introduced species
 Eurasian spoonbill - Platalea leucorodia - (Spatule blanche) Passage migrant

Osprey
Order: AccipitriformesFamily: Pandionidae

The family Pandionidae contains only one species, the osprey. The osprey is a medium-large raptor which is a specialist fish-eater with a worldwide distribution.

 Osprey - Pandion haliaetus - (Balbuzard pêcheur) Resident breeder and winter visitor

Hawks, eagles, and kites
Order: AccipitriformesFamily: Accipitridae

Accipitridae is a family of birds of prey, which includes hawks, eagles, kites, harriers and Old World vultures. They have powerful hooked beaks for tearing flesh from their prey, strong legs, powerful talons and keen eyesight.

 Bearded vulture - Gypaetus barbatus - (Gypaète barbu) Resident breeder
 European honey-buzzard - Pernis apivorus - (Bondrée apivore) Passage migrant
 Cinereous vulture - Aegypius monachus
 Eurasian griffon - Gyps fulvus - (Vautour fauve) Accidental visitor
 Short-toed snake-eagle - Circaetus gallicus - (Circaète Jean-le-Blanc) Passage migrant
 Lesser spotted eagle - Clanga pomarina - (Aigle pomarin) Accidental visitor
 Black kite - Milvus migrans - (Milan noir) Passage migrant
 Booted eagle - Hieraaetus pennatus - (Aigle botté) Accidental visitor
 Imperial eagle - Aquila heliaca - Accidental visitor
 Golden eagle - Aquila chrysaetos - (Aigle royal) Resident breeder
 Bonelli's eagle - Aquila fasciata - (Aigle de Bonelli) Passage migrant
 Eurasian marsh-harrier - Circus aeruginosus - (Busard des roseaux) Passage migrant and resident breeder
 Hen harrier - Circus cyaneus - (Busard Saint-Martin) Passage migrant and winter visitor
 Pallid harrier - Circus macrourus - (Busard pâle) Accidental visitor
 Montagu's harrier - Circus pygargus - (Busard cendré) Passage migrant and occasional breeder
 Eurasian sparrowhawk - Accipiter nisus - (Épervier d'Europe) Resident breeder
 Northern goshawk - Accipiter gentilis - (Autour des palombes) Resident breeder
 Red kite - Milvus milvus - (Milan royal) Resident breeder and passage migrant
 Black kite - Milvus migrans 
 White-tailed eagle - Haliaeetus albicilla - (Pygargue à queue blanche) Former breeder
 Common buzzard - Buteo buteo - (Buse variable) Resident breeder and passage migrant
 Long-legged buzzard - Buteo rufinus - (Buse féroce) Accidental visitor

Barn-owls
Order: StrigiformesFamily: Tytonidae

Barn-owls are medium to large owls with large heads and characteristic heart-shaped faces. They have long strong legs with powerful talons. 

 Barn owl - Tyto alba - (Chouette effraie) Resident breeder

Owls
Order: StrigiformesFamily: Strigidae

Typical owls are small to large solitary nocturnal birds of prey. They have large forward-facing eyes and ears, a hawk-like beak and a conspicuous circle of feathers around each eye called a facial disc.

 Eurasian scops-owl - Otus scops - (Petit-duc scops) Resident breeder and passage migrant
 Eurasian eagle-owl - Bubo bubo - (Hibou grand-duc) Accidental visitor
 Eurasian pygmy-owl - Glaucidium passerinum
 Little owl - Athene noctua - (Chevêche d'Athéna) Occasional breeder?
 Long-eared owl - Asio otus - (Hibou moyen-duc) Passage migrant, winter visitor and occasional breeder
 Short-eared owl - Asio flammeus - (Hibou des marais) Passage migrant and winter visitor

Hoopoes
Order: BucerotiformesFamily: Upupidae

Hoopoes have black, white and orangey-pink colouring with a large erectile crest on their head.

 Eurasian hoopoe - Upupa epops - (Huppe fasciée) Breeding visitor, passage migrant and winter visitor

Kingfishers
Order: CoraciiformesFamily: Alcedinidae

Kingfishers are medium-sized birds with large heads, long, pointed bills, short legs and stubby tails.

 Common kingfisher - Alcedo atthis - (Martin-pêcheur d'Europe) Passage migrant, winter visitor and resident breeder

Bee-eaters
Order: CoraciiformesFamily: Meropidae

The bee-eaters are a group of birds in the family Meropidae. Most species are found in Africa but others occur in southern Europe, Madagascar, Australia and New Guinea. They are characterised by richly coloured plumage, slender bodies and usually elongated central tail feathers. All are colourful and have long downturned bills and pointed wings, which give them a swallow-like appearance when seen from afar. 

 Blue-cheeked bee-eater - Merops persicus - Accidental visitor
 European bee-eater - Merops apiaster - (Guêpier d'Europe) Breeding visitor and passage migrant

Rollers
Order: CoraciiformesFamily: Coraciidae

Rollers resemble crows in size and build, but are more closely related to the kingfishers and bee-eaters. They share the colourful appearance of those groups with blues and browns predominating. The two inner front toes are connected, but the outer toe is not. There are 12 species worldwide; one species occurs in Corsica.

 European roller - Coracias garrulus - (Rollier d'Europe) Passage migrant and possibly occasional breeder

Woodpeckers
Order: PiciformesFamily: Picidae

Woodpeckers are small to medium-sized birds with chisel-like beaks, short legs, stiff tails and long tongues used for capturing insects. Some species have feet with two toes pointing forward and two backward, while several species have only three toes. Many woodpeckers have the habit of tapping noisily on tree trunks with their beaks. 

 Eurasian wryneck - Jynx torquilla - (Torcol fourmilier) Resident breeder and passage migrant
 Eurasian three-toed woodpecker - Picoides tridactylus 
 Middle spotted woodpecker - Dendrocoptes medius 
 White-backed woodpecker - Dendrocopos leucotos 
 Great spotted woodpecker - Dendrocopos major - (Pic épeiche) Resident breeder
 Lesser spotted woodpecker - Dryobates minor - (Pic épeichette) Accidental visitor
 Eurasian green woodpecker - Picus viridis - (Pic vert) Accidental visitor
 Black woodpecker - Dryocopus martius - (Pic noir) Accidental visitor

Falcons and caracaras
Order: FalconiformesFamily: Falconidae

Falconidae is a family of diurnal birds of prey. They differ from hawks, eagles and kites in that they kill with their beaks instead of their talons. 

 Lesser kestrel - Falco naumanni - (Faucon crécerellette) Passage migrant and occasional breeder
 Eurasian kestrel - Falco tinnunculus - (Faucon crécerelle) Resident breeder and passage migrant
 Red-footed falcon - Falco vespertinus - (Faucon kobez) Passage migrant
 Eleonora's falcon - Falco eleonorae  - (Faucon d'Eléonore) Passage migrant
 Merlin - Falco columbarius - (Faucon émerillon) Passage migrant
 Eurasian hobby - Falco subbuteo - (Faucon hobereau) Breeding visitor and passage migrant
 Lanner falcon - Falco biarmicus - (Faucon lanier) Accidental visitor
 Saker falcon - Falco cherrug - Accidental visitor
 Peregrine falcon - Falco peregrinus - (Faucon pèlerin) Resident breeder

Old World orioles
Order: PasseriformesFamily: Oriolidae

The Old World orioles are colourful passerine birds. They are not related to the New World orioles.

 Eurasian golden oriole - Oriolus oriolus - (Loriot d'Europe) Passage migrant and breeding visitor

Shrikes
Order: PasseriformesFamily: Laniidae

Shrikes are passerine birds known for their habit of catching other birds and small animals and impaling the uneaten portions of their bodies on thorns. A typical shrike's beak is hooked, like a bird of prey.

 Red-backed shrike - Lanius collurio - (Pie-grièche écorcheur) Breeding visitor and passage migrant
 Isabelline shrike - Lanius isabellinus - (Pie-grièche isabelle) Accidental visitor
 Great gray shrike - Lanius excubitor - (Pie-grièche grise) Accidental visitor
 Lesser gray shrike - Lanius minor - (Pie-grièche à poitrine rose) Passage migrant
 Woodchat shrike - Lanius senator - (Pie-grièche à tête rousse) Breeding visitor and passage migrant

Crows, jays, and magpies
Order: PasseriformesFamily: Corvidae

The family Corvidae includes crows, ravens, jays, choughs, magpies, treepies, nutcrackers and ground jays. Corvids are larger than the average size for species in the order Passeriformes and some show high levels of intelligence. 

 Eurasian jay - Garrulus glandarius - (Geai des chênes) Resident breeder
 Eurasian magpie - Pica pica - (Pie bavarde) Occasional breeder and passage migrant
 Eurasian nutcracker - Nucifraga caryocatactes - (Cassenoix moucheté) Accidental visitor
 Red-billed chough - Pyrrhocorax pyrrhocorax  - (Crave à bec rouge) Accidental visitor
 Yellow-billed chough - Pyrrhocorax graculus - (Chocard à bec jaune) Resident breeder
 Eurasian jackdaw - Corvus monedula - (Choucas des tours) Passage migrant and occasional breeder
 Rook - Corvus frugilegus - (Corbeau freux) Accidental visitor but formerly winter visitor
 Carrion crow - Corvus corone - Accidental visitor
 Hooded crow - Corvus cornix - (Corneille mantelée) Resident breeder and perhaps passage migrant
 Common raven - Corvus corax - (Grand Corbeau) Resident breeder and perhaps passage migrant

Tits, chickadees, and titmice
Order: PasseriformesFamily: Paridae

The Paridae are mainly small stocky woodland species with short stout bills. Some have crests. They are adaptable birds, with a mixed diet including seeds and insects. 

 Coal tit - Periparus ater - (Mésange noire) Resident breeder and perhaps passage migrant
 Crested tit - Lophophanes cristatus
 Marsh tit - Poecile palustris
 Eurasian blue tit - Cyanistes caeruleus - (Mésange bleue) Resident breeder
 Great tit - Parus major - (Mésange charbonnière) Resident breeder and perhaps passage migrant

Penduline-tits
Order: PasseriformesFamily: Remizidae

The penduline-tits are a group of small passerine birds related to the true tits. They are insectivores.

 Eurasian penduline-tit - Remiz pendulinus - (Rémiz penduline) Passage migrant and winter visitor

Larks
Order: PasseriformesFamily: Alaudidae

Larks are small terrestrial birds with often extravagant songs and display flights. Most larks are dull in appearance. Their food is insects and seeds. 

 Greater short-toed lark - Calandrella brachydactyla - (Alouette calandrelle) Breeding visitor and passage migrant
 Calandra lark - Melanocorypha calandra - (Alouette calandre) Passage migrant
 Wood lark - Lullula arborea - (Alouette lulu) Resident breeder
 Eurasian skylark - Alauda arvensis - (Alouette des champs) Passage migrant, winter visitor and resident breeder
 Crested lark - Galerida cristata - (Cochevis huppé) Accidental visitor

Bearded reedling
Order: PasseriformesFamily: Panuridae

This species, the only one in its family, is found in reed beds throughout temperate Europe and Asia.

 Bearded reedling - Panurus biarmicus - (Panure à moustaches) Accidental visitor

Cisticolas and allies
Order: PasseriformesFamily: Cisticolidae

The Cisticolidae are warblers found mainly in warmer southern regions of the Old World. They are generally very small birds of drab brown or grey appearance found in open country such as grassland or scrub.

 Zitting cisticola - Cisticola juncidis - (Cisticole des joncs) Resident breeder and passage migrant

Reed warblers and allies
Order: PasseriformesFamily: Acrocephalidae

The members of this family are usually rather large for "warblers". Most are rather plain olivaceous brown above with much yellow to beige below. They are usually found in open woodland, reedbeds, or tall grass. The family occurs mostly in southern to western Eurasia and surroundings, but it also ranges far into the Pacific, with some species in Africa.

 Eastern olivaceous warbler - Iduna pallida - Accidental visitor
 Western olivaceous warbler - Iduna opaca
 Melodious warbler - Hippolais polyglotta - (Hypolaïs polyglotte) Passage migrant and breeding visitor
 Icterine warbler - Hippolais icterina - (Hypolaïs ictérine) Passage migrant
 Aquatic warbler - Acrocephalus paludicola - (Phragmite aquatique) Passage migrant
 Moustached warbler - Acrocephalus melanopogon - (Lusciniole à moustaches) Passage migrant, winter visitor and occasional breeder
 Sedge warbler - Acrocephalus schoenobaenus - (Phragmite des joncs) Passage migrant
 Marsh warbler - Acrocephalus palustris - (Rousserolle verderolle) Accidental visitor
 Eurasian reed warbler - Acrocephalus scirpaceus - (Rousserolle effarvatte) Breeding visitor and passage migrant
 Great reed warbler - Acrocephalus arundinaceus - (Rousserolle turdoïde) Breeding visitor and passage migrant

Grassbirds and allies
Order: PasseriformesFamily: Locustellidae

Locustellidae are a family of small insectivorous songbirds found mainly in Eurasia, Africa, and the Australian region. They are smallish birds with tails that are usually long and pointed, and tend to be drab brownish or buffy all over.

 River warbler - Locustella fluviatilis - (Locustelle fluviatile) Accidental visitor
 Savi's warbler - Locustella luscinioides - (Locustelle luscinioide) Passage migrant
 Common grasshopper-warbler - Locustella naevia - (Locustelle tachetée) Passage migrant

Swallows
Order: PasseriformesFamily: Hirundinidae

The family Hirundinidae is adapted to aerial feeding. They have a slender streamlined body, long pointed wings and a short bill with a wide gape. The feet are adapted to perching rather than walking, and the front toes are partially joined at the base.

 Bank swallow - Riparia riparia - (Hirondelle de rivage) Passage migrant
 Eurasian crag-martin - Ptyonoprogne rupestris - (Hirondelle de rochers) Resident breeder
 Barn swallow - Hirundo rustica - (Hirondelle rustique) Passage migrant and breeding visitor
 Red-rumped swallow - Hirundo daurica - (Hirondelle rousseline) Passage migrant and occasional breeder
 Common house-martin - Delichon urbicum - (Hirondelle de fenêtre) Passage migrant and breeding visitor

Leaf warblers
Order: PasseriformesFamily: Phylloscopidae

Leaf warblers are a family of small insectivorous birds found mostly in Eurasia and ranging into Wallacea and Africa. The species are of various sizes, often green-plumaged above and yellow below, or more subdued with grayish-green to grayish-brown colors.

 Wood warbler - Phylloscopus sibilatrix - (Pouillot siffleur) Passage migrant
 Western Bonelli's warbler - Phylloscopus bonelli - (Pouillot de Bonelli) Passage migrant and occasional breeder
 Yellow-browed warbler - Phylloscopus inornatus - (Pouillot à grands sourcils) Accidental visitor
 Willow warbler - Phylloscopus trochilus - (Pouillot fitis) Passage migrant
 Common chiffchaff - Phylloscopus collybita - (Pouillot véloce) Passage migrant, winter visitor and occasional breeder
 Greenish warbler - Phylloscopus trochiloides - Accidental visitor

Bush warblers and allies
Order: PasseriformesFamily: Scotocercidae

The members of this family are found throughout Africa, Asia, and Polynesia. Their taxonomy is in flux, and some authorities place some genera in other families.

 Cetti's warbler - Cettia cetti - (Bouscarle de Cetti) Resident breeder, passage migrant and winter visitor

Long-tailed tits
Order: PasseriformesFamily: Aegithalidae

Long-tailed tits are a group of small passerine birds with medium to long tails. They make woven bag nests in trees. Most eat a mixed diet which includes insects. 

 Long-tailed tit - Aegithalos longicaudus  - (Mésange à longue queue) Resident breeder

Sylviid warblers, parrotbills, and allies
Order: PasseriformesFamily: Sylviidae

The family Sylviidae is a group of small insectivorous passerine birds. They mainly occur as breeding species, as the common name implies, in Europe, Asia and, to a lesser extent, Africa. Most are of generally undistinguished appearance, but many have distinctive songs.

 Eurasian blackcap - Sylvia atricapilla - (Fauvette à tête noire) Resident breeder, passage migrant and winter visitor
 Garden warbler - Sylvia borin - (Fauvette des jardins) Passage migrant
 Barred warbler - Curruca nisoria - (Fauvette épervière) Accidental visitor
 Lesser whitethroat - Curruca curruca - (Fauvette babillarde) Accidental visitor
 Western Orphean warbler - Curruca hortensis - (Fauvette orphée) Occasional breeder and possibly passage migrant
 Rüppell's warbler - Curruca hortensis - Accidental visitor
 Sardinian warbler - Curruca melanocephala - (Fauvette mélanocéphale) Resident breeder
 Moltoni's warbler Curruca subalpina
 Eastern subalpine warbler - Curruca cantillans - (Fauvette passerinette) Breeding visitor and passage migrant
 Greater whitethroat - Curruca communis - (Fauvette grisette) Passage migrant and occasional breeder
 Spectacled warbler - Curruca conspicillata - (Fauvette à lunettes) Passage migrant and breeding visitor
 Marmora's warbler Curruca sarda - (Fauvette sarde) Resident breeder
 Dartford warbler - Curruca undata - (Fauvette pitchou) Resident breeder

Kinglets
Order: PasseriformesFamily: [[Regulidae]

The kinglets, also called crests, are a small group of birds often included in the Old World warblers, but frequently given family status because they also resemble the titmice. 

 Goldcrest - Regulus regulus - (Roitelet huppé) Resident breeder
 Common firecrest - Regulus ignicapillus - (Roitelet à triple bandeau) Resident breeder

Wallcreeper
Order: PasseriformesFamily: Tichodromidae

The wallcreeper is a small bird related to the nuthatch family, which has stunning crimson, grey and black plumage.

 Wallcreeper - Tichodroma muraria - (Tichodrome échelette) Winter visitor and resident breeder

Nuthatches
Order: PasseriformesFamily: Sittidae

Nuthatches are small woodland birds. They have the unusual ability to climb down trees head first, unlike other birds which can only go upwards. Nuthatches have big heads, short tails and powerful bills and feet. The Corsican nuthatch is France's sole endemic species.

 Corsican nuthatch - Sitta whiteheadi - (Sittelle corse) Resident breeder

Treecreepers
Order: PasseriformesFamily: Certhiidae

Treecreepers are small woodland birds, brown above and white below. They have thin pointed down-curved bills, which they use to extricate insects from bark. They have stiff tail feathers, like woodpeckers, which they use to support themselves on vertical trees. 

 Eurasian treecreeper - Certhia familiaris - (Grimpereau des bois) Resident breeder
 Short-toed treecreeper - Certhia brachydactyla - (Grimpereau des jardins) Accidental visitor

Wrens
Order: PasseriformesFamily: Troglodytidae

The wrens are mainly small and inconspicuous except for their loud songs. These birds have short wings and thin down-turned bills. Several species often hold their tails upright. All are insectivorous.

 Eurasian wren - Troglodytes troglodytes - (Troglodyte mignon) Resident breeder and possibly a passage migrant

Dippers
Order: PasseriformesFamily: Cinclidae

Dippers are a group of perching birds whose habitat includes aquatic environments in the Americas, Europe and Asia. They are named for their bobbing or dipping movements. 

 White-throated dipper - Cinclus cinclus - (Cincle plongeur) Resident breeder

Starlings
Order: PasseriformesFamily: Sturnidae

Starlings are small to medium-sized passerine birds. Their flight is strong and direct and they are very gregarious. Their preferred habitat is fairly open country. They eat insects and fruit. Plumage is typically dark with a metallic sheen.

 European starling - Sturnus vulgaris - (Étourneau sansonnet) Winter visitor, passage migrant and occasional breeder
 Spotless starling - Sturnus unicolor - (Étourneau unicolore) Resident breeder
 Rosy starling - Pastor roseus - Accidental visitor

Thrushes and allies
Order: PasseriformesFamily: Turdidae

The thrushes are a group of passerine birds that occur mainly in the Old World. They are plump, soft-plumaged, small-to-medium-sized insectivores or sometimes omnivores, often feeding on the ground. Many have attractive songs.

 White's thrush - Zoothera aurea - Accidental visitor
 Mistle thrush - Turdus viscivorus - (Grive draine) Passage migrant and winter visitor
 Song thrush - Turdus philomelos - (Grive musicienne) Passage migrant and winter visitor
 Redwing - Turdus iliacus - (Grive mauvis) Passage migrant and winter visitor
 Eurasian blackbird - Turdus merula - (Merle noir) Resident breeder, passage migrant and winter visitor
 Fieldfare - Turdus pilaris - (Grive litorne) Passage migrant and winter visitor
 Ring ouzel - Turdus torquatus - (Merle à plastron) Passage migrant and possibly a winter visitor
 Dusky thrush - Turdus eunomus - Accidental visitor
 Naumann's thrush - Turdus naumanni - Accidental visitor

Old World flycatchers
Order: PasseriformesFamily: Muscicapidae

Old World flycatchers are a large group of small passerine birds native to the Old World. They are mainly small arboreal insectivores. The appearance of these birds is highly varied, but they mostly have weak songs and harsh calls.

 Spotted flycatcher - Muscicapa striata - (Gobemouche gris) Passage migrant
 European robin - Erithacus rubecula - (Rougegorge familier) Resident breeder, passage migrant and winter visitor
 Thrush nightingale - Luscinia luscinia - Accidental visitor
 Common nightingale - Luscinia megarhynchos - (Rossignol philomèle) Breeding visitor and passage migrant
 Bluethroat - Luscinia svecica - (Gorgebleue à miroir) Passage migrant
 Red-breasted flycatcher - Ficedula parva - (Gobemouche nain) Accidental visitor
 Semicollared flycatcher - Ficedula semitorquata - (Gobemouche à demi-collier) Accidental visitor
 European pied flycatcher Ficedula hypoleuca - (Gobemouche noir) Passage migrant
 Collared flycatcher - Ficedula albicollis - (Gobemouche à collier) Passage migrant
 Common redstart - Phoenicurus phoenicurus - (Rougequeue à front blanc) Passage migrant
 Black redstart - Phoenicurus ochruros - (Rougequeue noir) Passage migrant, winter visitor and occasional breeder
 Rufous-tailed rock-thrush - Monticola saxatilis - (Monticole merle-de-roche) Breeding visitor and passage migrant
 Blue rock-thrush - Monticola solitarius - (Monticole merle-bleu) Resident breeder
 Whinchat - Saxicola rubetra - (Tarier des prés) Passage migrant and occasional breeder
 European stonechat - Saxicola rubicola - (Tarier pâtre) Passage migrant, winter visitor and resident breeder
 Northern wheatear - Oenanthe oenanthe - (traquet motteux) Passage migrant and breeding visitor
 Isabelline wheatear - Oenanthe isabellina - Accidental visitor
 Desert wheatear - Oenanthe deserti - (Traquet du désert) Accidental visitor
 Western black-eared wheatear - Oenanthe hispanica - (Traquet oreillard) Passage migrant

Waxwings
Order: PasseriformesFamily: Bombycillidae

The waxwings are a group of birds with soft silky plumage and unique red tips to some of the wing feathers. In the Bohemian and cedar waxwings, these tips look like sealing wax and give the group its name. These are arboreal birds of northern forests. They live on insects in summer and berries in winter.

Bohemian waxwing, Bombycilla garrulus - Accidental visitor

Accentors
Order: PasseriformesFamily: Prunellidae

The accentors are in the only bird family, Prunellidae, which is completely endemic to the Palearctic. They are small, fairly drab species superficially similar to sparrows. 

 Alpine accentor - Prunella collaris - (Accenteur alpin) Resident breeder and possibly a winter visitor
 Dunnock - Prunella modularis  - (Accenteur mouchet) Winter visitor and passage migrant

Old World sparrows
Order: PasseriformesFamily: Passeridae

Sparrows are small passerine birds. In general, sparrows tend to be small, plump, brown or grey birds with short tails and short powerful beaks. Sparrows are seed eaters, but they also consume small insects.

 House sparrow - Passer domesticus - (Moineau domestique) Accidental visitor and occasional breeder
 Italian sparrow - Passer italiae - (Moineau cisalpin) Resident breeder and passage migrant
 Spanish sparrow - Passer hispaniolensis - (Moineau espagnol) Resident breeder
 Eurasian tree sparrow - Passer montanus - (Moineau friquet) Resident breeder
 Rock sparrow - Petronia petronia - (Moineau soulcie) Resident breeder and passage migrant
 White-winged snowfinch - Montifringilla nivalis - (Niverolle alpine) Resident breeder

Wagtails and pipits
Order: PasseriformesFamily: Motacillidae

Motacillidae is a family of small passerine birds with medium to long tails. They include the wagtails, longclaws and pipits. They are slender, ground feeding insectivores of open country. 

 Gray wagtail - Motacilla cinerea - (Bergeronnette des ruisseaux) Resident breeder and winter visitor
 Western yellow wagtail - Motacilla flava - (Bergeronnette printanière) Passage migrant and occasional breeder
 Citrine wagtail - Motacilla citreola - (Bergeronnette citrine) Accidental visitor
 White wagtail - Motacilla alba - (Bergeronnette grise) Passage migrant, winter visitor and occasional breeder
 Richard's pipit - Anthus richardi - (Pipit de Richard) Accidental visitor
 Tawny pipit - Anthus campestris - (Pipit rousseline) Breeding visitor and passage migrant
 Meadow pipit - Anthus pratensis - (Pipit farlouse) Passage migrant and winter visitor
 Tree pipit - Anthus trivialis - (Pipit des arbres) Passage migrant
 Red-throated pipit - Anthus cervinus - (Pipit à gorge rousse) Passage migrant
 Water pipit - Anthus spinoletta - (Pipit spioncelle) Passage migrant, winter visitor and possibly breeding visitor
 Rock pipit - Anthus petrosus

Finches, euphonias, and allies
Order: PasseriformesFamily: Fringillidae

Finches are seed-eating passerine birds, that are small to moderately large and have a strong beak, usually conical and in some species very large. All have twelve tail feathers and nine primaries. These birds have a bouncing flight with alternating bouts of flapping and gliding on closed wings, and most sing well.

 Common chaffinch - Fringilla coelebs - (Pinson des arbres) Resident breeder, passage migrant and winter visitor
 Brambling - Fringilla montifringilla - (Pinson du Nord) Passage migrant and winter visitor
 Hawfinch - Coccothraustes coccothraustes - (Gros-bec casse-noyaux) Passage migrant, winter visitor and residential breeder
 Common rosefinch - Carpodacus erythrinus 
 Eurasian bullfinch - Pyrrhula pyrrhula - (Bouvreuil pivoine) Accidental visitor
 Trumpeter finch - Rhodopechys githaginea - (Roselin githagine) Accidental visitor
 European greenfinch - Chloris chloris - (Verdier d'Europe) Resident breeder
 Eurasian linnet - Linaria cannabina - (Linotte mélodieuse) Resident breeder, passage migrant and winter visitor
 Common redpoll - Acanthis flammea 
 Red crossbill - Loxia curvirostra - (Bec-croisé des sapins) Resident breeder and passage migrant
 European goldfinch - Carduelis carduelis - (Chardonneret élégant) Resident breeder and perhaps passage migrant
 Citril finch - Serinus citrinella - (Venturon montagnard) Resident breeder (includes S. c. corsicana)
 Corsican finch - Serinus corsicana - (Venturon corse)
 European serin - Serinus serinus - (Serin cini) Resident breeder and passage migrant
 Eurasian siskin - Spinus spinus - (Tarin des aulnes) Passage migrant, winter visitor and occasional breeder

Longspurs and snow buntings
Order: PasseriformesFamily: Calcariidae

The Calcariidae are a group of passerine birds which had been traditionally grouped with the New World sparrows, but differ in a number of respects and are usually found in open grassy areas.

 Lapland longspur - Calcarius lapponicus
 Snow bunting - Plectrophenax nivalis - (Plectrophane des neiges) Accidental visitor

Old World buntings
Order: PasseriformesFamily: Emberizidae

The emberizids are a large family of passerine birds. They are seed-eating birds with distinctively shaped bills. Many emberizid species have distinctive head patterns.

 Black-headed bunting - Emberiza melanocephala - (Bruant mélanocéphale)
 Red-headed bunting - Emberiza bruniceps - Accidental visitor
 Corn bunting - Miliaria calandra - (Bruant proyer) Passage migrant, winter visitor and resident breeder
 Rock bunting - Emberiza cia - (Bruant fou) Accidental visitor
 Cirl bunting Emberiza cirlus - (Bruant zizi) Resident breeder
 Yellowhammer - Emberiza citrinella - (Bruant jaune) Passage migrant
 Ortolan bunting - Emberiza hortulana - (Bruant ortolan) Passage migrant
 Reed bunting - Emberiza schoeniclus - (Bruant des roseaux) Passage migrant and winter visitor
 Little bunting - Emberiza pusilla - (Bruant nain) Accidental visitor

See also
List of birds of Metropolitan France
List of birds
Lists of birds by region

References

 An updated version of this checklist without the annotations is available as a pdf from Corse-Ornitho.

Further reading

External links

Avibase - Bird Checklists of the World: Corsica

Birds
Corsica
Corsica